Bangaon is a city and a municipality in North 24 Parganas district in the state of West Bengal, India. It is the headquarters of the Bangaon subdivision.

Geography

Location
It has an average elevation of 7 metres (22 feet). Arsenic contamination is a major concern in this area.

Area overview
The area shown in the map was a part of Jessore district from 1883. At the time of Partition of Bengal (1947) the Radcliffe Line placed the police station areas of Bangaon and Gaighata of Jessore district in India and the area was made a part of 24 Parganas district. The renowned novelist, Bibhutibhushan Bandopadhyay (of Pather Panchali fame) belonged to this area and many of his writings portray his experience in the area. It is a flat plain located in the lower Ganges Delta. In the densely populated area, 16.33% of the population lives in the urban areas and 83.67% lives in the rural areas.

Note: The map alongside presents some of the notable locations in the subdivision. All places marked in the map are linked in the larger full screen map.

Transport 
Public transport is provided by the rail, auto and buses. Bangaon railway station is part of the Kolkata Suburban Railway system. It is the last station on the Sealdah-Bangaon section of Eastern Railway, 77 km from Sealdah Station. The Sealdah–Bangaon railway was built between 1882 and 1884. Bangaon is well connected with others major places by buses, like Kolkata, Howrah, Dakshineshwar, Barasat, Habra, Barrackpore, Basirhat, Bagdaha, Kalyani, Krishnanagar, Chakdaha, Ranaghat, Karimpur, Digha, Santragachi etc.

Demographics 
In the 2011 census, Bangaon municipality had a population of 110,668, out of which 56,416 were males and 54,252 were females. The 0–6 years population was 8,452. Effective literacy rate for the 7+ population was 90.25 per cent.

Education 
Dinabandhu Mahavidyalay is the only degree college in Bangaon which is currently affiliated to West Bengal State University (formerly affiliated to University of Calcutta).
 
List of high secondary schools:-

 Bongaon High School
 Kumudini Uccha Balika Vidalaya
 Chhaygharia Rakhaldas High School
 Saktigarh High School
 New Bongaon High School
 Bongaon Kabi Keshablal Vidyapith
 Kalitala Desbandhu High School
 Champaberia High School
 Puratan Bonga High School
 Asit Biswas Shiksha Niketan
 Bongaon Ghosh Institution
 Jogendranath Vidyapith
 Debgarh High School
 Chhaygharia Thakur Haridas Uccha Balika Vidyalaya
 Nagendranath Vidyalaya
 Saradacharan Vidyapith
 New Bongaon Girls High School

Notable residents 

 Bibhutibhushan Bandyopadhyay, Bengali novelist
 Rakhaldas Bandyopadhyay, archeologist
 Jiban Ratan Dhar (1889–1963), politician
 Jogendra Nath Mandal, politician
 Dinabandhu Mitra, Bengali novelist
 Bibhas Roy Chowdhury, poet

See also 
 2000 India-Bangladesh floods
 Bangaon subdivision
 Ichamati River

References

External links 
 

Cities and towns in North 24 Parganas district
Cities in West Bengal